Villanterio is a comune (municipality) in the Province of Pavia in the Italian region Lombardy, located about 30 km southeast of Milan and about 15 km east of Pavia.

Villanterio borders the following municipalities: Gerenzago, Inverno e Monteleone, Magherno, Marudo, Sant'Angelo Lodigiano, Torre d'Arese, Valera Fratta.

References

Cities and towns in Lombardy